Malik Jamshed Altaf, son of Malik Muhammad Altaf, was born on October 13, 1962 at Nurpur, Attock. He is a Pakistani politician who had been a member of the Provincial Assembly of Punjab from August 2018 till January 2023. He did his Matriculation in 2004 from Rawalpindi. He has been a loyalist of Major Tahir Sadiq Khan. In 2017, Major Tahir Sadiq Khan joined Pakistan Tehreek-e-Insaf (PTI) with his group and strengthened Pakistan Tehreek-e-Insaf (PTI).

Political career
He served as Chairman Union Council Khunda, Jand, Attock during 1986-87, as Chairman Union Council Gulial and Khunda. He also served as Vice Chairman District Council Attock.
He was elected to the Provincial Assembly of the Punjab as a candidate of Pakistan Tehreek-e-Insaf (PTI) from Constituency PP-5 (Attock-V) in 2018 Pakistani general election. He received 57,333 votes and defeated Malik Bahdur Yar, a candidate of Pakistan Muslim League Nawaz (PML-N).

References

Living people
Punjab MPAs 2018–2023
Pakistan Tehreek-e-Insaf MPAs (Punjab)
Year of birth missing (living people)